Group A of the 2009 FIFA Confederations Cup took place from 14 to 20 June 2009 in Bloemfontein's Free State Stadium, Johannesburg's Ellis Park Stadium, and Rustenburg's Royal Bafokeng Stadium. The group consisted of Iraq, New Zealand, host nation South Africa, and Spain.

Standings

Matches

South Africa vs Iraq

New Zealand vs Spain

Spain vs Iraq

South Africa vs New Zealand

Iraq vs New Zealand

Spain vs South Africa

References

External links
 

Group A
Group
2008–09 in South African soccer
2008–09 in Iraqi football
2008–09 in New Zealand association football